Legendary Duck Tower is a 1980 fantasy role-playing game adventure published by Judges Guild.

Contents
Duck Tower is a dungeon adventure with hundreds of rooms.

Reception
Forrest Johnson, in The Space Gamer #29, commented that "Duck Tower is a wonder and a marvel, a priceless adventure for anyone who likes Runequest."

William Fawcett, in issue #44 of The Dragon, commented that "One of the weaknesses of many Runequest scenarios is that they sacrifice detail in the environment and dungeons, in favor of presenting the details of the statistics of a large number of non-player characters. [Duck Tower] is exceptional in that it not only avoids this problem, but does a very good job of presenting an interesting locale for adventuring in any system. This is definitely one of the best Runequest scenarios available and should be a must for anyone campaigning in the system."

Anders Swenson reviewed Duck Tower for Different Worlds magazine and stated that "The concept is one which should be applicable to many individually-written adventures, the found magical items are a new dimension to the game (there are no 'standard' RQ magic items in the tower as written) and overall it is a good investment for all RQ campaign referees."

Notes

References

Judges Guild RuneQuest adventures
Role-playing game supplements introduced in 1980
RuneQuest 2nd edition supplements